Caroline de Oliveira Saad Gattaz, better known as Carol Gattaz (born July 27, 1981), is a volleyball player from Brazil.  She competed at the 2020 Summer Olympics, in the Women's tournament, winning a silver medal. Gattaz won the World Grand Prix three times in a row.

Early career
She was born in São José do Rio Preto. Before playing volleyball, as a teenager, Gattaz played futsal, defending her city's club América-SP, where she played as a striker. Still in high school, she started playing volleyball.

Career
Gattaz, who plays as a middle blocker, started her career defending São Caetano, then moved to Rexona-Ades in 2000. After leaving Rexona-Ades in 2001, she played for several clubs, before joining Finasa/Osasco in 2004, when she won the Superliga Brasileira de Voleibol, she left the club after the 2006–2007 season. In 2007, she moved to Italy, where she played for Monte Schiavo, returning in the following season to Brazil, to defend Rexona-Ades again. In 2011-2012 she played for Volei Futuro from Brazil.

National team
Defending the national team, she won the South American Women's Volleyball Championship in 2003, 2005, 2007, and 2009 and the World Grand Prix in 2004, 2005, 2006, 2008 and 2009.

Personal life 
She is openly lesbian.

Awards

Individuals
 2005 South American Championship – "Best Blocker"
 2009 South American Championship– "Best Blocker"
 2009 South American Club Championship – "Best Blocker"
 2009 Montreux Volley Masters – "Best Blocker"
 2018 South American Club Championship – "Most Valuable Player"
 2019 South American Club Championship – "Most Valuable Player"
 2018–19 Brazilian Superliga – "Best Middle Blocker"
 2020 South American Club Championship – "Best Blocker"
 2021 FIVB Nations League - "Best Middle Blocker"
 2020 Tokyo Olympics 2020 - "Best Blocker"
 2021 South American Championship – "Best Blocker"

Clubs
 2004–05 Brazilian Superliga –  Champion, with Finasa/Osasco
 2005–06 Brazilian Superliga –  Runner-up, with Finasa/Osasco
 2006–07 Brazilian Superliga –  Runner-up, with Finasa/Osasco
 2008–09 Brazilian Superliga –  Champion, with Rexona/Ades
 2009–10 Brazilian Superliga –  Runner-up, with Unilever Vôlei
 2010–11 Brazilian Superliga –  Champion, with Unilever Vôlei
2011–12 Brazilian Superliga –  Bronze medal, with Vôlei Futuro
2015–16 Brazilian Superliga –  Bronze medal, with Camponesa/Minas 
2017–18 Brazilian Superliga –  Bronze medal, with Camponesa/Minas
 2018–19 Brazilian Superliga –  Champion, with Itambé/Minas
2020–21 Brazilian Superliga –  Champion, with Itambé/Minas
2012–13 Azerbaijan Superleague –  Runner-up, with Igtisadchi Baku
 2009 South American Club Championship –  Runner-up, with Unilever Vôlei
 2018 South American Club Championship –  Champion, with Camponesa/Minas
 2019 South American Club Championship –  Champion, with Itambé/Minas
 2020 South American Club Championship –  Champion, with Itambé/Minas
 2018 FIVB Club World Championship –  Runner-up, with Itambé/Minas

References

1981 births
Living people
People from São José do Rio Preto
Brazilian people of Arab descent
Brazilian women's volleyball players
Middle blockers
Expatriate volleyball players in Italy
Expatriate volleyball players in Azerbaijan
Brazilian expatriates in Italy
Brazilian expatriate sportspeople in Azerbaijan
Volleyball players at the 2020 Summer Olympics
Olympic volleyball players of Brazil
Brazilian LGBT sportspeople
LGBT volleyball players
Medalists at the 2020 Summer Olympics
Olympic medalists in volleyball
Olympic silver medalists for Brazil
21st-century LGBT people
Sportspeople from São Paulo (state)
21st-century Brazilian women